Amelia Boone (born September 27, 1983) is an American obstacle racer. She used to be an attorney for the law firm of Skadden, Arps, Slate, Meagher & Flom, but now works for Apple Inc. in San Jose, California.

As one of the most accomplished obstacle course racing (OCR) athletes in the history of the sport, she has won both the Spartan Race World Championship (2013) and World's Toughest Mudder (three times 2012, 2014 and 2015). In 2014, she won the WTM title eight weeks after major knee surgery.

She is sponsored by Reebok, BeetElite, RockTape, Sufferfest Beer Company, and Ultimate Direction, and has been featured in a Tough Mudder commercial for Oberto Jerky, alongside sportscaster Stephen A. Smith.

Boone appeared on the cover of the August 2015 issue of Runner's World magazine, which included the article "The Obstacle Course Race Superstar: How Amelia Boone went from hating running to dominating races".

Boone has a chapter giving advice in Tim Ferriss' book Tools of Titans.

Education 
In 2002 Boone graduated from Lakeridge High School in Lake Oswego, Oregon. In 2006 she graduated from Washington University in St. Louis, Missouri, with a degree in anthropology and political science. Then in 2009 she graduated from University of Washington School of Law with a Juris Doctor (J.D.) degree.

Race history 

2016
Sean O'Brien 100k (02.06.16): 2nd place female, 4th place overall

2015
Rodeo Beach 30k (12.12.15): 1st place female
World's Toughest Mudder (11.14.15); 1st place female
Spartan Team Championships (10.31.15): 1st place team
Spartan Race World Championships (10.3.15): 4th place female
Tri-State Super Spartan (9.12.15): 1st place female
Washougal Spartan Sprint (8.8.15): 2nd place female
Palmerton Spartan Super (7.11.15): 1st place female
Salt Lake Spartan Super (6.26.15): 1st place female
Breckenridge Spartan Sprint (6.12.15): 2nd place female
Monterey Spartan Super (6.6.15) 1st place female
Indiana Spartan Sprint (5.16.15): 1st place female
Montana Spartan Sprint (5.10.15): 2nd place female
Rodeo Beach Rumble 30k (4.25.15): 1st place female; 3rd overall
Tri-State Spartan Beast (4.18.15); 1st place female
Georgia Death Race 68 mi (3.15.15); 3rd place female
XTerra McDowell Mountain 15 mi (2.1.15): 1st place female

2014
World's Toughest Mudder (11.15 - 11.16.14): 1st place female
Spartan World Championships (9.20.14): DNS
Virginia Super Spartan (8.23.14): 1st place female
Washougal Spartan Sprint (8.3.14): 2nd place female
Pennsylvania Spartan Sprint (7.12.14): 1st place female
Tuxedo Spartan Sprint (6.8.14): 1st place female
Tuxedo Spartan Sprint (6.7.14): 2nd place female
Mud, Guts & Glory (5.24.14): 1st place female
Bonefrog Challenge (5.17.14): 1st place female
Indiana Spartan Sprint (4.26.14): 1st place female
Las Vegas Super Spartan (4.5.14): 2nd place female
Charlotte Spartan Sprint (3.23.14): 1st place female
Atlas Race (2.23.14): 1st place female; 2nd place team
Tampa Spartan Sprint (2.15.14): 2nd place female

2013
Spartan Race World Championships (VT Beast) (9.21.13): 1st place female
Mud Guts and Glory (8.31.13): 1st place female
Pacific Northwest Spartan Sprint Championship (8.3.2013): 1st place female
Midwest Super Spartan (7.21.13): 1st place female
Midwest Super Spartan Championship (7.20.13): 1st place female
2013 Peak Death Race (6.21.13): 3rd place female
Indiana Spartan Sprint (4.27.13): 1st place female
Las Vegas Super Spartan (4.6.13): 3rd place female

2012
2012 World's Toughest Mudder (11.17.12): 1st place female; 2nd place overall
Midwest Super Spartan (10.27.12): 1st place female
Vermont Spartan UltraBeast - 2012 Spartan Championship (9.22.12): 2nd place female
2012 Peak Death Race (6.15.12): 2nd place female
Civilian Military Combine - TriState (5.18.12): 1st place overall; 1st place female
2012 Winter Death Race (3.2.12): 1st place female; 3rd place overall

2011
2011 World's Toughest Mudder (12.16.11): 2nd place female; 11th place overall

References

External links

1983 births
Living people
American sportswomen
American women lawyers
Apple Inc. employees
Obstacle racing
Place of birth missing (living people)
Skadden, Arps, Slate, Meagher & Flom people
University of Washington School of Law alumni
Washington University School of Law alumni